Introduction of Budhasubba Temple

Budha Subba Temple is a well known religious temple of the eastern Nepal people. It is situated in Bijayapur of Dharan, Nepal. It is believed to fulfill the wishes and bring good luck to the people visiting there.

According to historian Iman Singh Chemjong, Bijayapur was the capital of the then Kirant Kingdom of king Bijayanarayan. According to others, Bijayapur was named after Sen King Bijaya. This temple is considered to be one of the most unique temples in the world.  Where there is a temple, there is no idol.  Along with this, the temple is offered pigs as well as wine.

The bamboo, which has no tip, is found at the site of some former Seuti river basin from the Dantakali temple. The absence of the tip of the bamboos is believed to be due to Budha Subba who had broken the tips off the bamboo.

Budhasubba and his sister Subbini used to play hunting on the mountain with pellet bow and clay pellet. One day, when they were aiming to hit the crow, the bamboo tip broke due to the clay pellet hit by Budhasubba. Since that day, the tip of the bamboo didn’t grow.

So Budha Subba stopped hunting and buried his pellet bow under the earth. He then meditated there where the temple now stands. His sister Subbini’s temple is also nearby.

Location
Budha Subba Temple is located in Dharan about 136 mi (or 220 km) east of country's capital city. The site is located on the top of the seuti river bank, to small distance east of the Dantakali temple.

Origin

Myth 
According to myth, a Subba hunter Budha Subba and his sister used to play and hunt on the hill with a slingshot. By hitting the tips of a bamboo tree while hunting crow, the tip of the bamboo tree was lost and never grew back. After the miss, Subba gave up hunting, buried his slingshot and started meditation. It is the same spot where the temple stands today and the small mound of mud is believed to be the spot where he meditated. According to this legend, the temple got its name from the hunter. His sister  has a temple by its side. Interestingly even today, the bamboo trees in Bijaypur hill do not have a tips and not a single crow could be found in the area, despite the occasional picnickers and the offerings in the temple.

History 

According to the History it is the tomb of the last Limbu King of Limbuwan (Pallo kirat), He was tricked into coming to Bijaypur-Dharan for a negotiation, then killed by the assassins of King Prithvi Narayan Shah of the Kingdom of Nepal in 1773. Budhhi Karna  Khebang's soul is believed to have wandered around the area of his tomb around Bijaypur and was said to be a friendly and helpful spirit. Then local Limbu people started worshiping the soul as an old king ( Haang means King in Limbu language) believing it to bring good luck.

Lord Shiva/ Parvati 
Some say Lord Shiva and Goddess Parvati under the guise of Theba Sammang and Yuma Sammang, Yakthung King and Queen in the process of hunting arrived at Vijaypur where they stuck their bows and sat in a penance. During then, they realized the approach of Kali Yuga and immediately disappeared. That event is called Budha subba in Yakthung language. From the bows sprouted bamboo shoots without the tuft.

Eklavya 
Another myth mentions the event of Ekalavya in deep meditation and self training of archery by setting up an image of Guru Dronacharya, famous teacher of Kauravas and Pandavas. It says Ekalavya himself is Budha subba. Worship and meditation at this place are believed to fulfill one's wishes.

Bamboo writings and threads 
In the vicinity of the temple, initially there was a trend of writing on the bamboo tree. The young men who came to visit the temple would return only by writing a name on bamboo as it is believed that writing the name of lovers will give success in their love. But, the temple committee has stopped the name writings on the bamboo as the name writings of the bamboo hampered the growth of the bamboo with the increase in bamboo writings. Nowadays, lovers tie sacred threads to the bamboo after worshiping Budha subba.

Translation:

will go to budha subba to write on bamboo trees today!

how long should I stay thinking that you will come...

References

Shrines
Hindu temples in Koshi Province
Buildings and structures in Sunsari District